Clarke Boland Big Band en Concert avec Europe 1 is a live album by the Kenny Clarke/Francy Boland Big Band featuring a performance recorded in Paris in 1969, originally broadcast on Europe 1 and released on the Tréma label in 1992.

Reception

AllMusic awarded the album 4½ stars stating "the band is quite powerful throughout the set with Griffin generally taking solo honors. Easily recommended".

Track listing
All compositions by Francy Boland except where indicated.

Disc one
 "Pentonville" - 7:17
 "All Through the Night" (Cole Porter) - 4:13
 "Gloria" (Bronisław Kaper) - 5:31
 "Now Hear My Meaning" (Jimmy Woode) - 7:58
 "New Box" - 7:03  
 "You Stepped Out of a Dream" (Nacio Herb Brown, Gus Kahn) - 3:29  
 "Volcano" (Kenny Clarke) - 4:28  
 "Box 702" - 15:25

Disc two
 "The James' are Coming" (Johnny Griffin) - 7:17  
 "I'm Glad There Is You" (Jimmy Dorsey, Paul Madeira) - 5:12  
 "Doing Time" - 5:47  
 "Evanescene" - 3:52  
 "Sonor" (Clarke) - 3:12  
 "Sax No End" - 19:15

Personnel 
Kenny Clarke - drums
Francy Boland - piano, arranger
Benny Bailey, Art Farmer, Idrees Sulieman, Derek Watkins - trumpet
Nat Peck, Åke Persson, Eric van Lier - trombone
Derek Humble - alto saxophone 
Johnny Griffin, Ronnie Scott, Tony Coe - tenor saxophone
Sahib Shihab - baritone saxophone
Jimmy Woode - bass
Kenny Clare - drums

References 

1992 live albums
Kenny Clarke/Francy Boland Big Band albums
Live jazz albums